Smith of Wootton Major, first published in 1967, is a novella by J. R. R. Tolkien.

Background
The book began as an attempt to explain the meaning of Faery by means of a story about a cook and his cake, and Tolkien originally thought to call it The Great Cake. It was intended to be part of a preface by Tolkien to George MacDonald's famous fairy story The Golden Key. Tolkien's story grew to become a tale in its own right. The story was first published on 9 November 1967. It was first published in the United States on 23 November 1967 in the Christmas edition of Redbook magazine, but without the illustrations by Pauline Baynes that appeared in the published book.

Smith of Wootton Major is not connected to the Middle-earth legendarium, except by the thematic "Faery" motif of the traveler who journeys to a land that lies beyond the normal world and is usually beyond the reach of mortals. (Smith can thus be likened to Beren in the realm of Thingol, or Eärendil journeying to Valinor, or Ælfwine's visit to Tol Eressëa.)

It is sometimes published in an omnibus edition with Farmer Giles of Ham, another Tolkien novella with illustrations by Pauline Baynes. The two stories are not obviously linked, other than by their common authorship. These two, together with The Adventures of Tom Bombadil and "Leaf by Niggle", have appeared as Tales from the Perilous Realm.

The most recent (2005) edition, edited by Verlyn Flieger, includes a previously unpublished essay by Tolkien, explaining the background and just why the elf-king spent so long in Wootton Major. It also explains how the story grew from this first idea into the published version.

Plot summary

The village of Wootton Major was well known around the countryside for its annual festivals, which were particularly famous for their culinary delights. The biggest festival of all was the Feast of Good Children. This festival was celebrated only once every twenty-four years:  twenty-four children of the village were invited to a party, and the highlight of the party was the Great Cake, a career milestone by which Master Cooks were judged. In the year the story begins, the Master Cook was Nokes, who had landed the position more or less by default; he delegated much of the creative work to his apprentice Alf. Nokes crowned his Great Cake with a little doll jokingly representing the Queen of Faery.  Various trinkets were hidden in the cake for the children to find; one of these was a star the Cook discovered in the old spice box.

The star was not found at the Feast, but was swallowed by a blacksmith's son. The boy did not feel its magical properties at once, but on the morning of his tenth birthday the star fixed itself on his forehead, and became his passport to Faery. The boy grew up to be a blacksmith like his father, but in his free time he roamed the Land of Faery. The star on his forehead protected him from many of the dangers threatening mortals in that land, and the Folk of Faery called him "Starbrow". The book describes his many travels in Faery, until at last he meets the true Queen of Faery.  The identity of the King is also revealed.

The time came for another Feast of Good Children. Smith had possessed his gift for most of his life, and the time had come to pass it on to some other child. So he regretfully surrendered the star to Alf, and with it his adventures into Faery.  Alf, who had become Master Cook long before, baked it into the festive cake once again for another child to find. After the feast, Alf retired and left the village; and Smith returned to his forge to teach his craft to his now-grown son.

Themes 

T. A. Shippey, in The Road to Middle-earth says that "defeat hangs heavy" in the story.  Tolkien called it "an old man's book", with presage of bereavement.  Renunciation is certainly a major theme, but so is an appreciation of imaginative vision, as against the philistine outlook represented by the old cook Nokes, a shallow, sly and lazy man. Nokes is foremost among the non-believers, and dismisses all things magical as mere dreams and fancies. In the end he has a frightening encounter with the King of Faery, but even this leaves him basically unchanged in outlook.

Shippey also suggests that, while Tolkien discouraged reading this story as allegory, a good case can be made that Nokes represents the literary, critical approach to studying English, belittling the contributions of the philological approach represented by the previous Master Cook.  On this reading, the little star trinket turns into the talisman that cuts through Nokes's sweet, sticky nonsense and raises the smith's life from the ordinary to something deeply meaningful.

Edition Notes 
The first (UK) edition (1967) was published in a 15.5 cm (6") format with pictorial boards and illustrations by Pauline Baynes, later impressions have a white border on the covers. Probably issued without dust jacket. There were seven impressions to 1974.

The second (UK) edition (1975) was published in a 27 cm (9") format in the same style as the first edition of The Adventures of Tom Bombadil (1962). The pictorial boards are an additional illustration by Pauline Baynes. Evidence, such as the price being printed on the back-cover, suggest that it was issued without dust-jacket.

References

External links
Introduction and overview of Smith of Wootten Major
Smith of Wootten Major book

Books by J. R. R. Tolkien
1967 books
Fantasy short stories
1967 short stories
British novellas
Allen & Unwin books